The 2021 Clemson Tigers softball team is the varsity college softball team that represented Clemson University during the 2021 NCAA Division I softball season.  This was the second season of Clemson's softball program.  The Tigers competed in the Atlantic Coast Conference (ACC) and were led by head coach John Rittman.  Clemson played its home games at McWhorter Stadium in Clemson, South Carolina.

The Tigers finished their first full season as a program 44–8 and 29–5 in ACC play to finish in first place and claim the regular season championship. They earned an at-large bid to the NCAA tournament and were placed into the Tuscaloosa Regional. There they defeated Troy twice, but lost to Alabama twice to end their season.

The team was led by Valerie Cagle who finished with 28 wins and 15 home runs.  Cagle was named to the USA Softball Collegiate Player of the Year top 10 finalist list. She also won ACC Player and Freshman of the year while head coach John Rittman was named ACC Coach of the Year.  Cagle and outfielder McKenzie Clark were named to the National Fast Pitch Coaches Association All-Region Southeast teams, with Cagle being named to the first team and Clark being named to the second team.  Cagle would later be selected to the NFCA All-American Second Team, marking Clemson's first All-American in program history.

Previous season 
The 2020 season was impacted by the coronavirus pandemic.  On March 12, it was announced that the 2020 NCAA tournament would be canceled due to the pandemic.  Clemson University suspended all events until April 5, 2020. On March 17, the ACC cancelled all spring athletic activities and thereby ended the softball season. The Tigers finished the season 19–8 and 5–1 in ACC play.

Personnel

Roster

Coaches

Schedule

{| class="toccolours" width=95% style="clear:both; margin:1.5em auto; text-align:center"
|-
! colspan=2 style="" | 2021 Clemson Tigers softball game log
|-
! colspan=2 style="" | Regular season
|- valign="top" 
|

{| class="wikitable collapsible collapsed" style="margin:auto; width:100%; text-align:center; font-size:95%"
! colspan=12 style="padding-left:4em;" | April (15–0)
|-
! Date
! Rank
! Opponent
! Site/stadium
! Score
! Win
! Loss
! Save
! Attendance
! Overall record
! ACC record
|- style="background:#bfb;"
| Apr 1 || No. 18 ||  || McWhorter Stadium • Clemson, SC || W 4–1 || Cagle (14–3) || Pickett (8–5) || None || 372 || 23–4 || 15–4
|- style="background:#bfb;"
| Apr 2 || No. 18 || North Carolina || McWhorter Stadium • Clemson, SC || W 6–1 || Thompson (4–1) || Pickett (8–6) || None || 372 || 24–4 || 16–4
|- style="background:#bfb;"
| Apr 2 || No. 18 || North Carolina || McWhorter Stadium • Clemson, SC || W 12–1 (5) || Cagle (15–3) || Olinger (0–2) || None || 372 || 25–4 || 17–4
|- style="background:#bfb;"
| Apr 3 || No. 18 || North Carolina || McWhorter Stadium • Clemson, SC || W 9–1 (6) || Cagle (16–3) || Olinger (0–3) || None || 372 || 26–4 || 18–4
|- style="background:#bbb;"
| Apr 9 || No. 18 || at  || Melissa Cook Stadium • Notre Dame, IN || colspan=7 rowspan=4 | Postponed due to COVID-19
|- style="background:#bbb;"
| Apr 10 || No. 18 || at Notre Dame || Melissa Cook Stadium • Notre Dame, IN 
|- style="background:#bbb;"
| Apr 10 || No. 18 || at Notre Dame || Melissa Cook Stadium • Notre Dame, IN 
|- style="background:#bbb;"
| Apr 11 || No. 18 || at Notre Dame || Melissa Cook Stadium • Notre Dame, IN 
|- style="background:#bfb;"
| Apr 13 || No. 17 || * || McWhorter Stadium • Clemson, SC || W 9–0 (5) || Cagle (17–3) || Watson (11–9) || None || 372 || 27–4 || 18–4
|- style="background:#bfb;"
| Apr 13 || No. 17 || Winthrop* || McWhorter Stadium • Clemson, SC || W 6–2 || Thompson (5–1) || Weixlmann (7–7) || None || 372 || 28–4 || 18–4
|- style="background:#bfb;"
| Apr 16 || No. 17 ||  || McWhorter Stadium • Clemson, SC || W 6–0 || Cagle (18–3) || Anderson (5–12) || None || 372 || 29–4 || 19–4
|- style="background:#bfb;"
| Apr 17 || No. 17 ||  Boston College || McWhorter Stadium • Clemson, SC || W 10–2 (6) || Thompson (6–1) || Anderson (5–13) || None || 372 || 30–4 || 20–4 
|- style="background:#bfb;"
| Apr 17 || No. 17 || Boston College || McWhorter Stadium • Clemson, SC || W 4–3 (9) || Cagle (19–3) || Anderson (5–14) || None || 372 || 31–4 || 21–4
|- style="background:#bfb;"
| Apr 18 || No. 17 || Boston College || McWhorter Stadium • Clemson, SC ||  W 6–0 || Cagle (20–3) || Schnackenberg (2–1) || None || 372 || 32–4 || 22–4
|- style="background:#bfb;"
| Apr 21 || No. 16 || at * || Beckham Field • Columbia, SC || W 6–0 || Cagle (21–3) || Drotar (3–6) || None || 400 || 33–4 || 22–4
|- style="background:#bfb;"
| Apr 23 || No. 16 ||  || McWhorter Stadium • Clemson, SC || W 9–3 || Cagle (22–3) || Czech (3–3) || None || 474 || 34–4 || 23–4
|- style="background:#bfb;"
| Apr 23 || No. 16 || NC State || McWhorter Stadium • Clemson, SC || W 4–3 || Spencer (6–0) || Nester (7–7) || None || 474 || 35–4 || 24–4
|- style="background:#bfb;"
| Apr 25 || No. 16 || NC State || McWhorter Stadium • Clemson, SC || W 4–3 || Cagle (23–3) || Trahan (11–6) || None'' || 474 || 36–4 || 25–4
|- style="background:#bfb;"
| Apr 25 || No. 16 || NC State || McWhorter Stadium • Clemson, SC || W 4–3 || Thompson (7–1) || Czech (3–4) || Cagle (5) || 474 || 37–4 || 26–4
|}

|-
! colspan=2 style="" | Postseason
|- 
|

|- 
|

|}

Note: All rankings shown are from the NFCA/USA Today poll.

 Rankings *''' Softball America released a poll on May 25, 2021, during the NCAA tournament while all other polls did not release a poll.  Pre-tournament rankings for NCFA, USA, and D1 Softball are shown for week 15 rankings.

References

Clemson
Clemson Tigers softball seasons
Clemson softball
Clemson